Bishop of České Budějovice is the diocesan bishop of the Diocese of České Budějovice, which covers the south of Bohemia and small tail of southwest Moravia.

Jan Prokop Schaaffgotsche (1785–1813)
Arnošt Konstantin Růžička (1815–1845)
Josef Ondřej Lindauer (1845–1850)
Jan Valerián Jirsík (1851–1883)
 Karel Průcha (he was appointed 1883, but did not undertake dioceses for illness, died closely after appointing)
František Schönborn (1883–1885; 1985–1899 Archbishop of Prague)
Martin Josef Říha (1885–1907)
Josef Antonín Hůlka (1907–1920)
Šimon Bárta (1920–1940)
 Antonín Eltschkner (appointed 1940, for resistance of Germany occupational power could not undertake diocese)
Josef Hlouch (1947–1972, did not manage diocese on 1950–1968 for repression from communistic authority, 1952–1963 was interned outside diocese)
Miloslav Vlk (1990–1991; from 1991 Archbishop of Prague)
Antonín Liška (1991–2002)
Jiří Paďour (2002–2014)
Vlastimil Kročil (2015–present)

References 
 Encyklopedie Českých Budějovic; NEBE, České Budějovice 2006,  S 46–47
 Jaroslav V. Polc: Stručný přehled dějin českých a moravských diecézí po třicetileté válce; KTF UK, Praha 1995; S. 67–74